The Sheffield Brightside and Hillsborough by-election was a UK parliamentary by-election in the constituency of Sheffield Brightside and Hillsborough in South Yorkshire. It was caused by the death of the sitting Member of Parliament (MP) Harry Harpham on 4 February 2016. Harpham had been the Labour Party MP for the seat since the 2015 general election. The by-election took place on 5 May 2016, the same day as local elections in the United Kingdom.

Candidates
Sheffield City Council published the statement of persons nominated on 8 April 2016. This showed that seven candidates would contest the by-election.

The Labour candidate was Gill Furniss, a Sheffield city councillor and the widow of Harry Harpham.

UKIP's candidate was Steven Winstone, a local metal trader and businessman. He focused his campaign on protecting jobs in the local steel industry. He had stood for the party in Sheffield South East in the 2015 general election, where he came second.

The Conservatives selected Spencer Pitfield.

The Liberal Democrats selected Shaffaq Mohammed, a city councillor.

The Green Party reselected Christine Gilligan Kubo, a lecturer at Sheffield Business School, and their candidate from the 2015 general election.

Bobby Smith of the New Fathers 4 Justice campaign announced that he would stand in the by-election. He stood under the label "Give Me Back Elmo". He had contested the 2015 general election under the same description in Prime Minister David Cameron's Witney constituency, but took only 37 votes. Smith, of Stevenage, also contested the borough council election in his home town on the same day as the by-election.

Yorkshire First selected Stevie Manion.

Result

Previous election

See also
 List of United Kingdom by-elections (2010–present)

Notes and references
Notes 
  
References

2016 elections in the United Kingdom
By-elections to the Parliament of the United Kingdom in Sheffield constituencies
2010s in Sheffield
May 2016 events in the United Kingdom